Glendale Farm is a historic home and farm located near Berryville, Clarke County, Virginia. The main house was built about 1847, and is a two-story, five bay, double-pile, brick dwelling. The interior features most of its original provincial Greek Revival woodwork.  Also on the property are the contributing one-story, two-unit kitchen/laundry/slave quarters outbuilding; Appalachian double-crib log barn; corn crib, granary, and hog shed.

It was listed on the National Register of Historic Places in 1990.

References

Houses on the National Register of Historic Places in Virginia
Farms on the National Register of Historic Places in Virginia
National Register of Historic Places in Clarke County, Virginia
Greek Revival houses in Virginia
Houses completed in 1847
Houses in Clarke County, Virginia
1847 establishments in Virginia
Slave cabins and quarters in the United States